The IBM ThinkPad T43 is a laptop from the ThinkPad line that was manufactured by IBM and Lenovo.

References

External links 

 Thinkwiki.de - T43
 ThinkPad T43 recovery discs

IBM laptops
ThinkPad